Roy Rogers (1911-1998) was a famous singing cowboy actor. 

Roy Rogers may also refer to:

 Roy Rogers Restaurants, restaurant chain
 Roy Rogers (drink), a non-alcoholic mixed drink
 Roy Rogers (basketball), American former NBA basketball player and assistant coach
 Roy Rogers (guitarist), slide guitarist
 "Roy Rogers", a song by Elton John from the album Goodbye Yellow Brick Road
 "Roy Rogers McFreely", an episode of American Dad!